Frederick Hanna Zebouni (27 January 1914 – 27 April 2014) was a Lebanese sailor who competed at the 1960 Summer Olympics, where he finished 31st alongside Antoine Sader in the Flying Dutchman class. Born in Istanbul, he was a member of Yacht Club Beirut and later moved to Baton Rouge, Louisiana, where he died in April 2014 at the age of 100.

References

1914 births
2014 deaths
Olympic sailors of Lebanon
Sailors at the 1960 Summer Olympics – Flying Dutchman
Lebanese male sailors (sport)
Lebanese centenarians
Men centenarians
Lebanese emigrants to the United States